Laos competed at the 2008 Summer Paralympics in Beijing, China.

Medalists

Sports

Powerlifting

See also
Laos at the Paralympics
Laos at the 2008 Summer Olympics

References

 

Nations at the 2008 Summer Paralympics
2008
Paralympics